Marty Wilde,  (born Reginald Leonard Smith; 15 April 1939) is an English singer and songwriter. He was among the first generation of British pop stars to emulate American rock and roll, scoring several 1950s hit singles including "Endless Sleep", "Sea of Love" and "Bad Boy". During the 1960s and 1970s, Wilde continued to record and, with Ronnie Scott, co-wrote hit singles for others including the Casuals' "Jesamine" and Status Quo's "Ice in the Sun". He is the father of pop singer Kim Wilde and co-wrote many of her hit singles including "Kids in America" with his son Ricky. He continues to perform and record.

Career
Wilde was born in Blackheath, London.  He was performing under the name Reg Patterson at London's Condor Club in 1957, when he was spotted by impresario Larry Parnes.
Parnes gave his protégés stage names such as Billy Fury, Duffy Power and Dickie Pride, hence the change to Wilde. The 'Marty' came from the acclaimed 1955 film of the same name.  Wilde was signed to the British recording arm of Philips Records, with US releases appearing on the Epic label via Philips' reciprocal licensing agreement with Columbia Records stateside.  (Philips had yet to acquire the Mercury group as its US division.)

From mid-1958 to the end of 1959 Wilde was one of the leading British rock-and-roll singers, along with Tommy Steele and Cliff Richard. Wilde's backing group was called the Wildcats. At various times they featured Big Jim Sullivan on lead guitar, Tony Belcher on rhythm guitar, Bobby Graham or Bobbie Clarke on drums, plus Brian Locking on bass guitar and Brian Bennett on drums, both of whom later joined the Shadows.

He appeared regularly on the BBC Television show 6.5 Special and was the main regular artiste on the Saturday ITV popular music shows Oh Boy! and Boy Meets Girls. There he met Joyce Baker, one of the Vernons Girls who were also show regulars. Their courtship was made public but after their marriage Wilde's popularity as a teen idol declined.

He moved partly into all-round entertainment, appearing in musicals such as Conrad Birdie in the original West End production of Bye Bye Birdie and several films. He enjoyed success as a songwriter in the late 1960s and early 1970s. In collaboration with the songwriter Ronnie Scott, he co-wrote the one-hit wonders the Casuals' "Jesamine" under the pseudonyms of Frere Manston and Jack Gellar. The pair also wrote Lulu's "I'm a Tiger" and the early Status Quo hit, "Ice in the Sun".

He also tried to tap into the growing glam rock boom, releasing the single "Rock'n'Roll Crazy" / "Right On!" billed as Zappo, and recording as The Dazzling All Night Rock Show ("20 Fantastic Bands"), and Ruby Pearl and The Dreamboats ("The Shang-A-Lang Song"). None of the releases were a commercial success, and Wilde ditched the glam rock genre, going on to work with his son, Ricky Wilde.

Like many of his contemporaries, Wilde continued to perform in nostalgia tours in the UK and beyond. In 2007, he celebrated 50 years in the business with another UK tour which featured his youngest daughter Roxanne Wilde, and the issue of a compilation album, Born To Rock And Roll – The Greatest Hits. It included a duet with Kim Wilde of Elton John's "Sorry Seems to Be the Hardest Word", which was released as a promotional only single.

In 2017, Wilde went on a UK tour with The Solid Gold Rock'n'Roll Show, which also featured Eden Kane, Mark Wynter and Mike Berry.

In 2019, he toured the UK again with American artist Charlie Gracie and Mike Berry.  The projected 2020 tour  has been re-scheduled to 2021 due to the Covid-19 health situation.

On 9 October 2020, Wilde entered the UK Albums Chart at number 75 with Running Together.  It was released on his own Pushka label, and featured his daughters Kim and Roxanne Wilde, with input from son Ricky. Wilde thus has the distinction of UK chart success, as either a singer or songwriter, across eight consecutive decades.

Family
He and his wife, Joyce, have four children, Kim (born 1960), Ricky (born 1961), Roxanne (born 1979) and the youngest, Marty Jr (born 1983), who was a contestant on the Golf Channel's The Big Break IV: USA vs. Europe in 2005. Kim, Ricky and Roxanne have worked in the music industry, like their parents.

Discography

Songwriting
Wilde wrote and co-wrote the following notable songs:
"Bad Boy" - Robin Luke, Robert Gordon, Nirvana, Françoise Hardy (song title styled as "Pas Gentille")
"Cambodia" - Kim Wilde
"Chequered Love" - Kim Wilde
"Child Come Away" - Kim Wilde
"Ego" - Kim Wilde
"Four Letter Word" - Kim Wilde
"House of Salome" - Kim Wilde
"I'm A Tiger" - Lulu 
"Ice in the Sun" - Status Quo
"Jesamine" - The Casuals
"It's Here" - Kim Wilde
"Kids in America" - Kim Wilde
"Love Blonde" - Kim Wilde
"Love in the Natural Way" - Kim Wilde
"Never Trust a Stranger" - Kim Wilde
"Rage to Love" - Kim Wilde
"Schoolgirl" - Kim Wilde
"The Second Time" - Kim Wilde
"The Touch" - Kim Wilde
"View from a Bridge" - Kim Wilde
"Water on Glass" - Kim Wilde
"Young Heroes" - Kim Wilde

Filmography
Marty Wilde has appeared in the following films:-
 Jet Storm (1959)
 The Hellions (1961)
 What a Crazy World (1963)
 Stardust (1974)

See also
List of show business families
List of Epic Records artists

References

External links
 Official Marty Wilde website (with discography)
 
 Marty Wilde page @ www.45rpm.org.uk
 'His violent hip-swinging was revolting': Fifty years ago this month, the fever of rock'n'roll came to British TV screens. Cliff Richard and Marty Wilde tell John Pidgeon how Jack Good created Oh Boy!'
 
 
 
 
 Entries at 45cat.com

1939 births
Living people
English pop singers
English male singers
Jamie Records artists
English songwriters
People from Blackheath, London
Singers from London
Musicians from Kent
British rock and roll musicians
British rockabilly musicians
Members of the Order of the British Empire
Philips Records artists
Epic Records artists
British male songwriters